Tilganga Institute of Ophthalmology, formerly called the Tilganga Eye Centre, in Nepal is the implementing body of the Nepal Eye Program, a non-profit, community based, non-government organization launched in 1992. It was founded in part by renowned ophthalmologist and cataract surgeon Sanduk Ruit. The current facility was opened in 1994. The World Health Organization recognized Tilganga Institute of Ophthalmology as a WHO Collaboration Centre of Ophthalmology in 2019. In Nepal, it is the second institute, and first institute in the field of ophthalmology to receive this designation. It provides various sub speciality services of Ophthalmology such as Cornea, Cataract & IOL, Glaucoma, Oculoplastic, Lacrimal and Ocular Oncology services, Pediatric Ophthalmology and Strabismus services, Vitreo-Retina, Uvea, Neuro ophthalmology and Optometry services.

Facilities
According to the centre, provided facilities include:
A clinical facility for eye care which delivers services to patients. 
An education & training department which runs Fellowship program, MD Residency Program in Ophthalmology, Master of Optometry, Bachelor in Optometry and Vision Science, Certificate in Ophthalmic Science and short applied training for local & international medical personnel and eye health workers.
An outreach unit which runs 2 community eye hospital, 18 rural community eye centres and high-volume outreach microsurgical eye clinics for the rural community throughout Nepal and committed similar efforts regularly in China, Bangladesh, Bhutan, India, Cambodia and North Korea.
An eye bank which undertakes cornea harvesting activity to provide corneas for corneal transplant operations and awareness programs for overcoming resistance to eye donation.
A manufacturing facility which specializes in the production of intraocular lenses (IOLs) for use in cataract surgery. 
A research unit which focuses on improving clinical as well as operational activities. TIO has continuously involved itself in research activities for the development of eye care.

References

External links
 
 "The Tilganga Institute of Ophthalmology in Nepal"
 Newar, Naresh. "An eye for an eye". Nepali Times. Issue 188 (19–25 March 2004)

Medical colleges in Nepal
Hospitals in Nepal
1994 establishments in Nepal
Hospitals established in 1994
Educational institutions established in 1994